Henry J. Stehling (March 21, 1918 – February 2, 2001) was a brigadier general in the United States Air Force.

Biography
Stehling was born in Milwaukee, Wisconsin, in 1918. He attended the University of Wisconsin-Madison and George Washington University.

Career
Stehling was commissioned an officer in the United States Army in 1942. During World War II he was stationed in the Alaska Territory. In 1948 he transferred to the Air Force and was stationed at Tyndall Air Force Base, Pinecastle Air Force Base, and Randolph Air Force Base. In 1959 he was assigned to The Pentagon. Later he was assigned to Pacific Air Forces and Air Training Command. His retirement was effective as of August 1, 1970.

Awards received include the Legion of Merit with oak leaf cluster and the Army Commendation Medal with two oak leaf clusters.

References

External links
Henry J. Stehling's obituary in Air Force Civil Engineer, Page 31

Military personnel from Milwaukee
United States Air Force generals
United States Army Air Forces officers
Recipients of the Legion of Merit
United States Army Air Forces personnel of World War II
University of Wisconsin–Madison alumni
George Washington University alumni
1918 births
2001 deaths